Katherine Adrielle "Kathy" Reyes Bersola (born March 18, 1996) is a Filipino volleyball athlete. She played with the University of the Philippines - UP Lady Maroons Volleyball Team. Bersola holds a degree in Sports Science with summa cum laude honors from UP Diliman and later admitted at UP College of Medicine.

Career
Bersola played with UP Lady Maroons Volleyball Team from UAAP Season 75  to UAAP Season 79, being team captain of the UP Lady Maroons Volleyball Team for UAAP Season 78.

Bersola finished with an average of 1.18 and graduated in 2017 with a degree of Bachelor of Sports Science from the College of Human Kinetics in the University of the Philippines. She is among that year's 36 summa cum laude graduates from the institution. University of the Philippines Lady Fighting Maroon volleybelle is the first summa cum laude graduate from the College of Human Kinetics. She was selected ABS-CBN Sports Player of the Week on March 27, 2017, and Philips Gold–PVL Press Corps Player of the Week on July 24, 2017.

Clubs
  Perlas Spikers (2017–present)

Awards

Individual
 UAAP Season 76 "Best Middle Blocker"
 2015 Shakey's V-League Season 12 Reinforced "1st Best Middle Blocker"
 2016 Shakey's V-League Season 13 Open Conference "2nd Best Middle Blocker"
 2018 Premier Volleyball League Open Conference "2nd Best Middle Blocker"
 2019 Premier Volleyball League Reinforced Conference "1st Best Middle Blocker"

Collegiate
 2015 Shakey's V-League Reinforced Conference –  Bronze medal, with the UP Lady Maroons
 2016 Shakey's V-League Collegiate Conference –  Bronze medal, with the UP Lady Maroons

Club
 2018 Premier Volleyball League Open Conference -  Bronze medal, with the BanKo Perlas Spikers
 2018 Vietnam Vinh Long Television Cup -  Bronze medal, with the BanKo Perlas Spikers
 2019 Premier Volleyball League Open Conference -  Bronze medal, with the BanKo Perlas Spikers

External links
PLDT Home Player's Profile

References

Filipino women's volleyball players
University Athletic Association of the Philippines volleyball players
1996 births
Living people
People from Parañaque
University of the Philippines Diliman alumni
Middle blockers
Volleyball players from Metro Manila
21st-century Filipino women